The 2004–05 St. Francis Terriers men's basketball team represented St. Francis College during the 2004–05 NCAA Division I men's basketball season. The team was coached by Ron Ganulin, who was in his fourteenth year at the helm of the St. Francis Terriers. The Terrier's home games were played at the  Generoso Pope Athletic Complex. The team has been a member of the Northeast Conference since 1981.

The Terriers were chosen to finish 7th in the NEC Preseason Coaches Poll. The team finished at 13–15 overall and 9–9 in conference play to take the 7th seed as predicted. The Terriers qualified for the NEC tournament losing in the quarter finals to Fairleigh Dickinson 60–78. After the season Ron Ganulin was fired as head coach of the program.

Roster

Schedule and results

|-
!colspan=12 style="background:#0038A8; border: 2px solid #CE1126;;color:#FFFFFF;"| Regular season

|-
!colspan=12 style="background:#0038A8; border: 2px solid #CE1126;;color:#FFFFFF;"| 2005 NEC tournament

References

St. Francis Brooklyn Terriers men's basketball seasons
St. Francis
2004 in sports in New York City
2005 in sports in New York City